Kulbatpur  is a village in Pursurah community development block of Arambagh subdivision in Hooghly District in the Indian state of West Bengal. It is 7 km from Tarakeswar .

Geography
Kulbatpur is located in Hooghly district in Indian state of West Bengal with coordinates

Demographics
 India census, Kulbatpur had a population of 4038. Males constitute 51.4% of the population and females 48.6%.

References 

Villages in Hooghly district